The 2015 Copa EuroAmericana was the third and final edition of the Copa EuroAmericana, a men's football friendly tournament created by DirecTV. This edition took place in venues across South America from 28 May to 1 August 2015. Six teams (Barcelona, Deportivo Cali, Peñarol and San Lorenzo from CONMEBOL, and Espanyol and Málaga from UEFA), participated in the tournament. South America (represented by the CONMEBOL teams) won the cup with three victories.

Format
Each match was played for 90 minutes. In case of a draw after regulation, the winner was determined via a penalty shoot-out. The confederation of the winning team of each match was awarded with a point, and the confederation with the most points at the end of the tournament was crowned champions.

Participating teams

Venues

Standings

Matches

Top goalscorers

See also
2015 Supercopa Euroamericana

References

External links 

2015 Copa EuroAmericana: Official site

Soccerway.com - 2015 Copa EuroAmericana

2015 in South American football
Copa EuroAmericana
Ecuadorian football friendly trophies
Colombian football friendly trophies
Argentine football friendly trophies
Uruguayan football friendly trophies